Albert John Inks (January 27, 1871 – October 3, 1941) was a 19th-century Major League Baseball pitcher. Inks played from 1891 to 1896 for 6 different franchises, all in the National League.

External links

Baseball Almanac

1871 births
1941 deaths
19th-century baseball players
Baseball players from Indiana
Major League Baseball pitchers
Brooklyn Grooms players
Baltimore Orioles (NL) players
Philadelphia Phillies players
Louisville Colonels players
Cincinnati Reds players
Washington Senators (1891–1899) players
People from Ligonier, Indiana
Grand Rapids Shamrocks players
Omaha Omahogs players
Omaha Lambs players
Monmouth (minor league baseball) players
St. Paul Apostles players
Duluth Whalebacks players
Fort Wayne (minor league baseball) players
Binghamton Bingos players
Springfield Ponies players
Oil City Oilers players
St. Paul Saints (Western League) players
Buffalo Bisons (minor league) players
Springfield Maroons players
Norfolk Jewels players
Minor league baseball managers